Chaudhry Pervaiz Elahi (Urdu, ; born 1 November 1945) is a Pakistani politician who is the former Chief Minister of Punjab when he, as Chief Minister, had dissolved the Assembly. He had been a member of the Provincial Assembly of the Punjab from August 2018 till January 2023. In 2023, he left the Pakistan Muslim League (Q) (PML(Q)) and joined Pakistan Tehreek-e-Insaf (PTI) and was appointed its president along with his son, Moonis Elahi, and other ten former PML(Q) MPAs over political rifts with the party president, Chaudhry Shujaat Hussain. He was the former president of the Punjab Division of the PML(Q).  

He served as the First Deputy Prime Minister of Pakistan in 2013. After a successful campaign in the 2002 general elections, he became the Chief Minister of Punjab and held this position until 2007. In 2008, he served as the leader of the opposition in the National Assembly of Pakistan for short time. He was a member of the National Assembly from 2008 to May 2018. He has also been the Speaker of the Provincial Assembly of Punjab from 2018 to 2022. In a major development in late February 2023, Pervaiz Elahi announced joining Imran Khan-led party along with 10 of his party's former MPAs.He is the former president of the Punjab Division of Pakistan Muslim League (Q). On 7th March 2023, Pevaiz Elahi was appointed as President of the Pakistan Tehreek-e-Insaf.

Early life and education
Chaudhry Pervaiz Elahi was born 1 November 1945 in Gujrat, Punjab to the industrialist Chaudhry Manzoor Elahi Warraich. Elahi belongs to a Punjabi Jatt family of Warraich clan. He hails from a family of politicians and industrialists of Gujrat. Chaudhary received his early education from Forman Christian College, Lahore until 1967 and later attended Watford College of Technology from where he received his Diploma in Industrial Management.

He is a cousin of former Prime Minister of Pakistan Chaudhry Shujaat Hussain.

Personal life
He is married to the daughter of his uncle Chaudhry Zahoor Elahi. He has two sons, Moonis Elahi and Rasikh Elahi.

Political career

Elahi began his political career after being elected as the chairman of the district council of Gujrat for the four years in 1983.

He served as Provincial Minister for Local Government and Rural Development for a period of eight years from 1985 to 1993.

He was elected as a member of the Provincial Assembly of Punjab for the first time in 1985, second time in 1988, third time in 1990, and fourth time in 1993.

He also served as the acting leader of the opposition in the Provincial Assembly of Punjab from 1993 to 1996, in the absence of Shahbaz Sharif who had gone to the United Kingdom for medical treatment.

Several cases were registered against Elahi during Benazir Bhutto's government in 1993-1996 and he was sent to Adiala Jail where he spent several months.

It was reported that Nawaz Sharif had promised Elahi that if PML-N won the 1997 Pakistani general election, Elahi would be made the chief minister of Punjab. However, when  PML-N won the 1997 general elections, Nawaz appointed his brother Shahbaz Sharif as the Chief Minister of Punjab. To avoid the impression that Elahi was unhappy with this  decision of Nawaz Sharif. Elahi supported Shahbaz Sharif for the position of Chief Minister however decided not to join the provincial cabinet of Shahbaz Sharif.

He was re-elected as a member of the Provincial Assembly of Punjab for the fifth time in 1997 and was elected as the speaker of Provincial Assembly of Punjab in 1997 where he remained until June 2001.

Following the 1999 coup he was detained by the National Accountability Bureau on corruption charges. Charges were dropped following an agreement they made to defect from the Pakistan Muslim League (N) with whom he had been part of until the ouster of the PML-N government and assist President Pervez Musharraf in building PML-Q.

He along with his cousin Shujaat and other dissidents left PML-N to form their own party, PML-Q.

He was re-elected as a member of the Provincial Assembly of Punjab for the sixth time in 2002 Pakistani general election.

Following the elections, Elahi was appointed as the chief minister of Punjab for the first time where he served from October 2002 until the dissolution of the provincial government in October 2007.

In the 2008 Pakistani general election, Elahi was elected as the member of the National Assembly of Pakistan for the first time and as the member of the Provincial Assembly of Punjab for the seventh time.

PML-Q nominated Elahi as its candidate for the post of prime ministers of Pakistan following the 2008 general elections.

In 2008, he was made the Leader of the Opposition in the National Assembly, however he quit this post later that year.

He was made Federal Minister for Defence Production and Industries in Yousuf Raza Gilani cabinet.

In 2011, the ceremonial post of deputy prime minister of Pakistan was created to appoint Elahi as the first deputy prime minister of Pakistan having no powers even in the absence of the prime minister of Pakistan.

In 2013 Pakistani general election, Elahi ran for seat of National Assembly from the NA-105 Gujrat constituency and won it defeating candidates of PPP and PML-N.

He was re-elected to the National Assembly as a candidate of PML-Q from NA-65 (Chakwal-II) and NA-69 (Gujrat-II) in the 2018 Pakistani general election. In the same election, he was re-elected to the Provincial Assembly of Punjab as a candidate of PML-Q from PP-30 (Gujrat-III). Following his successful election, he abandoned his national assembly seats in favor of the provincial assembly seat. He was named by Pakistan Tehreek-e-Insaf (PTI) and PML-Q as their joint candidate for the office of Speaker of the Provincial Assembly of Punjab. On 16 August 2018, he was elected as Speaker of the Punjab Assembly. He received 201 votes against his opponent Muhammad Iqbal Gujjar who secured 147 votes.

On 19 August 2018, he became acting governor of Punjab following the resignation of Rafique Rajwana.
In March 2022, Imran Khan nominated Pervez Elahi as a candidate for the post of Chief Minister of Punjab after the resignation of Usman Buzdar.

After a four-month long constitutional crisis, he took oath as the 18th Chief Minister of Punjab on 27 July 2022, at Aiwan-e-Sadr Islamabad.

On 22 December 2022, the Governor of Punjab, Balighur Rehman, denotified Elahi from his position, citing his failure to take a vote of confidence from the Provincial Assembly, which the Governor requested, as the reason behind his action. However, he was restored by the Lahore High Court on 23 December 2022.

On 12 January 2023, after securing victory in a vote of confidence the night before, Elahi sent a letter to Governor Rehman, advising him to dissolve the Provincial Assembly, effectively calling snap elections across Punjab.

On 22 January 2023, he was replaced as Chief Minister by Mohsin Raza Naqvi, who was appointed by the Election Commission of Pakistan to lead a caretaker government.

In 2023, he left PML (Q) and joined PTI along with his Son Moonis Elahi and other ten former MPAs of Pakistan Muslim League (Q) over political rifts with the President of Pakistan Muslim League (Q), Chaudhry Shujaat Hussain. He was the former president of the Punjab Division of the PML(Q). He has been nominated as the central president of PTI and his nomination has been approved by the party leadership.

References

External link

|-

|-

Living people
1945 births
Pakistani prisoners and detainees
Pakistani businesspeople
Punjab MPAs 1985–1988
Punjab MPAs 1988–1990
Punjab MPAs 1990–1993
Punjab MPAs 1993–1996
Punjab MPAs 1997–1999
Punjab MPAs 2002–2007
Pakistani MNAs 2008–2013
Pakistani MNAs 2013–2018
Pakistan Muslim League (N) MPAs (Punjab)
Pakistan Muslim League (Q) MPAs (Punjab)
Pakistan Muslim League (Q) MNAs
Government of Shaukat Aziz
Deputy Prime Ministers of Pakistan
Speakers of the Provincial Assembly of the Punjab
Punjabi people
Chaudhry family
Chief Ministers of Punjab, Pakistan
Forman Christian College alumni
Leaders of the Opposition (Pakistan)
Politicians from Gujrat, Pakistan
Punjab MPAs 2018–2023
Defence Production Ministers of Pakistan